Brian Carroll (born 1981) is an American soccer player

Brian Carroll may also refer to:

Brian Carroll (Australian footballer) (born 1941), Australian footballer for Melbourne
Brian Carroll (hurler) (born 1983), Irish hurler
Brian T. Carroll (born 1949), American Solidarity Party presidential candidate
Buckethead (born 1969), stage name of Brian Carroll, American multi-instrumentalist